Emington is a village in Livingston County, Illinois, United States. The population was 117 at the 2010 census.

Geography

Demographics

As of the 2000 United States Census, there were 120 people, 49 households, and 26 families residing in the village. The racial makeup of the village was 97.50% White, 0.83% Asian, and 1.67% from two or more races.

There were 49 households, out of which 32.7% had children under the age of 18 living with them, 36.7% were married couples living together, 10.2% had a female householder with no husband present, and 44.9% were non-families. 38.8% of all households were made up of individuals, and 14.3% had someone living alone who was 65 years of age or older. The average household size was 2.45 and the average family size was 3.37.

In the village, the population was spread out, with 30.8% under the age of 18, 13.3% from 18 to 24, 28.3% from 25 to 44, 15.0% from 45 to 64, and 12.5% who were 65 years of age or older. The median age was 32 years. For every 100 females, there were 100.0 males. For every 100 females age 18 and over, there were 88.6 males.

The median income for a household in the village was $30,417, and the median income for a family was $31,607. Males had a median income of $30,250 versus $16,875 for females. The per capita income for the village was $12,183. There were 16.1% of families and 12.5% of the population living below the poverty line, including 16.3% of under eighteens and 23.1% of those over 64.

References

Villages in Livingston County, Illinois
Villages in Illinois